Casa Piedra is a populated place situated in Santa Cruz County, Arizona, United States.

References

Populated places in Santa Cruz County, Arizona